The Constitutional Council (المجلس الدستوري) of Lebanon is a judicial body charged with reviewing statutes' constitutionality and resolving disputes about presidential and representative elections. Under Lebanon's constitution, the composition and functioning of the council are to be set by statute.

See also 

 Supreme Council (Lebanon)

References 

Law of Lebanon